Jurecki (feminine: Jurecka; plural: Jureccy) is a Polish surname. Notable people with the name include:

 Bartosz Jurecki (born 1979), Polish handball player
 Marcin Jurecki (1976–2008), Polish wrestler
 Michał Jurecki (born 1984), Polish handball player
 Mieczysław Jurecki (born 1956), Polish musician

See also
 
 Jurecki Młyn, a settlement in the administrative district of Gmina Morąg in northern Poland

Polish-language surnames